The Australian Representative Office, Ramallah is the Australian Government's foremost diplomatic presence to the Palestinian Authority in Ramallah. The office is headed by the Australian Representative to the Palestinian Authority, who is an officer of the Australian Department of Foreign Affairs and Trade. The Representative, since April 2022, is Edmund Russell.

On 23 August 2000 Australian Foreign Minister, Alexander Downer, announced that the Australian Government would open an Australian Representative Office in the West Bank city of Ramallah, to manage relations with the Palestinian Authority. Speaking of the importance of such an office, Downer said, "At this critical moment in the history of the contemporary Middle East, it is important for Australia to be closely informed of developments, to strengthen its relations with all key parties, and to play a positive and constructive part in support of negotiations to secure a just and comprehensive peace. The decision to establish the Australian Representative Office represents a significant step toward meeting that need." The office opened on 6 September 2000.

List of Representatives

See also
Foreign relations of Australia

References

External links
Australian Representative Office, Ramallah

Australia–State of Palestine relations
Palestine
Diplomatic missions in the State of Palestine
2000 establishments in the Palestinian territories
Organizations based in Al-Bireh